Thomas Frederick Rew (born March 18, 1922) is a retired United States Air Force major general who served as  commander of the 3rd Air Division. He retired in 1976.

References

1922 births
Living people
United States Air Force generals
United States Army Air Forces personnel of World War II
American centenarians
Men centenarians